Rangitikei may refer to the following in New Zealand:
 Rangitikei River, one of country's longest rivers
 Rangitikei District, a district council in the Manawatu-Wanganui Region
 Rangitīkei (New Zealand electorate), a current general electorate
 1978 Rangitikei by-election, a by-election held in 1978
 Wanganui and Rangitikei, a historic general electorate